Parafield Gardens is a suburb of Adelaide, South Australia. The suburb is largely residential, with a pocket of industrial land in the southwest corner. There are two small shopping centres in the area, one on Salisbury Highway, and another on Sheperdson Road.

History
Kaurna people occupied the land now called Parafield Gardens prior to European settlement. An Aboriginal heritage site within the Greenfield Industrial Estate indicates that Aboriginal settlement may have existed in the area for thousands of years.

Parafield Gardens was originally a subdivision of section 2258 of the Hundred of Yatala enclosing land south of the Little Para River and Kings Road and northeast of today's Salisbury Highway. In 1881 the government proposed the creation of a general cemetery on the subdivision but the plan was abandoned by 1906. Land in the subdivision began to be used as an experimental agricultural farm, followed by a poultry farm in 1911, known as Parafield Farm. In 1958, Matters & Co. offered residential land in the area bounded by Salisbury Highway, Shepherdson Road, Sunderland Avenue, and Catalina Avenue. In the 1970s the South Australian Housing Trust began building properties in the area. At some time between then and 2000 the suburb name of Parafield Gardens was formally adopted. The Pine Lakes Estate was established in the early 2000s southwest of the intersection of Salisbury Highway and Kings Road.

Parafield Gardens Post Office opened on 25 September 1961.

Schools
 
Parafield Gardens has five schools in its area and four of which are public. Karrendi Primary School, founded in 1969, is a public primary school on Bradman Road. Parafield Gardens High School, opened in 1976, is a public secondary school situated next to Parafield Gardens R-7 School, a public primary school like Karrendi except larger. Parafield Gardens Primary, Parafield Gardens High and the private primary school, Holy Family Catholic School are all on Sheperdson Road. A fourth primary school, The Pines School, is located on Andrew Smith Drive.

References

Suburbs of Adelaide